Blepharidopterus provancheri is a species of green coloured bugs from the Miridae family, that can be found in the United States and Canada.

References

Insects described in 1887
Orthotylini